Dobrev is a Bulgarian surname, derived from the personal name Dobri. It may refer to:
 Bogdan Dobrev, a Bulgarian rower
 Delyan Dobrev, a Bulgarian politician
 Dimitar Dobrev, a Bulgarian academic
 Dimitar Dobrev, a Bulgarian wrestler
 Dobri Dobrev, a Bulgarian footballer
 Dobri Dobrev, a Bulgarian beggar known for donating the money he collected towards the restoration of decaying Bulgarian monasteries and churches and the utility bills of orphanages
 Klára Dobrev, the Bulgarian descended wife of former Hungarian Prime Minister Ferenc Gyurcsány
 Konstantin Dobrev (born 1974), Bulgarian badminton player
 Kristian Dobrev, a Bulgarian footballer
 Milen Dobrev, a Bulgarian wrestler
 Nikolay Dobrev, a Bulgarian politician and candidate for prime minister of Bulgaria in 1997
 Nina Dobrev, a Bulgarian-Canadian actress

Bulgarian-language surnames